Abu Ghraib is a city in the Baghdad Governorate of Iraq.

Abu Ghraib or Abu Gharib may also refer to:

 Abu Ghraib District, Iraq
 Abu Ghraib prison, Abu Ghraib, Iraq
 Abu Ghraib torture and prisoner abuse
 Abu Ghraib, a series of artworks by Fernando Botero
 Abu Gharib, Iran

See also
Al Gharbiyah (disambiguation) 
Abu Gorab, Egypt